Chabahar\Konarak International Airport  is an international airport located in 49 kilometers west of the city of Chabahar, Sistan and Baluchestan Province, Iran, in Konarak. The airport has flight connections to  different parts of Iran and serves both cities. There are also flights offered to United Arab Emirates and to Oman.

Airlines and destinations

References

Airports in Iran
Transportation in Sistan and Baluchestan Province
Buildings and structures in Sistan and Baluchestan Province